is a district located in Wakayama Prefecture, Japan.

Towns and villages 
 Kimino

Mergers 
 On April 1, 2005 the town of Shimotsu merged into the city of Kainan.
 On January 1, 2006 the towns of Misato and Nokami merged to form the new town of Kimino.

Districts in Wakayama Prefecture